I am Radar is Reif Larsen's second novel, first published in 2015. The novel traces the life of Radar Radmanovic, a child born with charcoal-black skin. Like Larsen's debut, the book is an example of ergodic literature, including diagrams and footnotes within the text. The novel received mixed reviews.

References

2015 American novels

Penguin Press books
Novels set in New Jersey